Erwin König was a German Wehrmacht sniper reportedly killed by the Soviet sniper Vasily Zaytsev during the Battle of Stalingrad. 

König is mentioned both in Zaytsev's memoirs Notes of a Sniper (a "Major Konings", potentially SS) and William Craig's 1973 non-fiction book Enemy at the Gates: The Battle for Stalingrad. According to Zaytsev, the duel between him and König took place over a period of three days in the ruins of Stalingrad. In a post-war visit to Berlin, Zaytsev was allegedly confronted by a woman who told him that she was König's daughter, with Soviet authorities quickly evacuating Zaytsev to avoid any confrontation.

In popular culture
A fictionalized account of the duel in the film Enemy at the Gates portrays Erwin König—played by Ed Harris—as the head of the Wehrmacht Sniper School. He is sent to Stalingrad to take on the increasingly aggressive Soviet snipers. Initially he is successful, killing four of Zaytsev's partners, but eventually he is outwitted by the Russian, portrayed by Jude Law.

König appears in the 1999 novel War of the Rats by David L. Robbins in which he is an SS Colonel named Heinz Thorvald.

Ramón Rosanas wrote a comic about the conflict between Zaytsev and König.

References 

Fictional marksmen and snipers
Fictional Nazis
People whose existence is disputed